RC Varna is a Bulgarian rugby club in Varna.

History
The club was founded in 1964.

External links
RC Varna

Bulgarian rugby union teams
Rugby clubs established in 1964
Sport in Varna, Bulgaria